The LG Amsterdam Tournament 2005 was a pre-season football tournament contested by Ajax, Arsenal, Boca Juniors and Porto on 29 July and 31 July 2005 at the Amsterdam Arena.

Table

NB: An extra point is awarded for each goal scored.

Results

Day 1

Day 2

External links
Official site

2005 
2005–06 in Dutch football
2005–06 in Argentine football
2005–06 in Portuguese football
2005–06 in English football

it:Torneo di Amsterdam#2005